Manturovo is a rural locality (a selo) and the administrative center of Manturovsky District, Kursk Oblast, Russia. Population:

References

Notes

Sources

Rural localities in Kursk Oblast
Timsky Uyezd